Wilhelmina Elizabeth (Mien) van Bree (24 April 1915 - 4 August 1983) was a Dutch cyclist. She is considered a pioneer of women's cycling in the Netherlands.

Early years
Van Bree was the fourth of five children in a horticultural family, the daughter of Adrianus van Bree (1878–1959) and Elizabeth Hendrika van Beek (1884–1952). She grew up in the Tramstraat, in Loosduinen. Cycling was an early hobby for her. To train and test her speed, she chased after the buses. Her talent was noticed by neighbor Piet Moeskops, five-time sprint world champion (1921–1926). His compliments motivated her to further develop her cycling talent. In 1931 she founded, together with some girlfriends, the Hague women's cyclist club Vooruitgang Is Ons Streven (VIOS), one of the first Dutch women's cycling clubs. In the Netherlands in the 1930s, it was rejected that girls got on a racing bike, but Mien van Bree didn't like that.

Career 
Since the Dutch Cycling Union did not allow bicycle races for women, Van Bree moved to Belgium, where women could race. In addition, she cycled early in the morning from Loosduinen to Belgium, to ride a race in the afternoon. She participated in sprint, long distance, couple and tandem races on the track. In 1934 she became third during the world cycling championship and in the years 1935-1937 she finished second. She was always beaten by the Belgian Elvire De Bruyne from Erembodegem.

Van Bree won her first victory in 1937 during the European Cycling Championships. In 1938, after a race of one hundred kilometers in Rocourt, she became world champion. She also extended her European title. A year later, she also extended her world title. The outbreak of the Second World War marked the end of her cycling career.

Later life 
Van Bree worked as a psychiatric nursing assistant. After the death of her mother in 1952, she cared for her father until his death in 1959. On August 4, 1983, she was found dead at her home at the age of 68.

Legacy 
In 2015 (her hundredth year of birth), the municipality of The Hague named a cycle path in Loosduinen after her: the "Mien van Breepad".

On March 24, 2016 [10] the book Mien - A forgotten history was published by writer Mariska Tjoelker .

References

Dutch female cyclists
1915 births
1983 deaths
20th-century Dutch women
Cyclists from The Hague